Unplugged: Long Way From Home is the third studio album by South African rock band Taxi Violence, released in September 2011.

Reception 

Unplugged: Long Way From Home received positive reviews all round. The single "Heads or Tails (unplugged)" was playlisted on National radio stations. The album received two South African Music Award nominations in 2012. One for Best Rock Album and another for Best Group.

Track listing

References

2011 albums
Taxi Violence albums